Kayla Cromer (born February 17, 1998) is an American actress. In 2020, she began appearing as Matilda in the series Everything's Gonna Be Okay. She is the first autistic actor to play an autistic main character in a TV series.

Early life
Cromer was born in San Jose, California, to Pam and Reno Cromer and grew up in the suburb of Morgan Hill. She became interested in the paranormal at age 9 and received her first piece of paranormal investigation equipment at age 10 as a Christmas gift. Cromer has investigated famous locations such as the RMS Queen Mary when she was in eighth grade and the Winchester Mystery House. 

Originally wanting to be a criminal profiler with the FBI, she began to desire a career in acting after watching Keira Knightley in Pirates of the Caribbean: The Curse of the Black Pearl. In 2017 she moved to Los Angeles to focus on her acting career.

Career
Cromer made her acting debut in the TV series South of Hell in 2015. She later appeared in the films Desert Dwellers and Blood Orange, the latter of which she wrote before landing the role of Matilda in Everything's Gonna Be Okay. She was set to appear in a film titled Okinawa but production was derailed due to the death of the writer and director in 2018. She has also worked as a model.

Personal life
Cromer was diagnosed with dyscalculia, dyslexia and attention deficit hyperactivity disorder at the age of 7 and was diagnosed with autism spectrum disorder years later. She publicly disclosed her diagnosis at the 2019 Freeform Summit. She is the first autistic actor to play an autistic main character in a TV series and works as an activist trying to end the stigma of being autistic.

Filmography

Film

Television

References

External links
 
 

Actors with autism
Actors with dyslexia
21st-century American actresses
1998 births
Living people